Pedro Martínez (19 May 1893 – 19 October 1931) was an Argentine footballer. He played in 15 matches for the Argentina national football team from 1916 to 1919. He was also part of Argentina's squad for the 1916 South American Championship.

References

External links
 

1893 births
1931 deaths
Argentine footballers
Argentina international footballers
Place of birth missing
Association football midfielders
Club Atlético Huracán footballers